Jean Bernard-Luc, real name Lucien Boudousse, (Guatemala City, 8 February 1909 – Pontoise (Val-d'Oise), 18 May 1985) was a 20th-century French screenwriter and dialoguist.

Biography 
Born in Guatemala, he arrived in France with his parents aged 3. He studied at Gerson, at the lycée Janson-de-Sailly, then in an École supérieure de commerce.

In 1935, he participated to the writing of the film Michel Strogoff, directed by Jacques de Baroncelli. During World War II, he joined the army. Taken prisoner, he managed to escape and enter the zone libre. He would then write many scenarios, including that of Les Cadets de l'océan by Jean Dréville in 1945.

During the 1950s and 1960s, Jean-Luc Bernard wrote many films, some of which obtained a great success. The second part of his career was essentially dedicated to television but also to a new genre, biology-science-fiction novels.

Jean Bernard-Luc died in 1985 at Pontoise, after a long illness.

Theatre 
Author
1947: L'amour vient en jouant, directed by Pierre-Louis, Théâtre Édouard VII
1949: Nuit des hommes, directed by André Barsacq, Théâtre de l'Atelier
1950: , directed by Christian-Gérard, Théâtre Montparnasse
1952: La Feuille de vigne, directed by Pierre Dux, Théâtre de la Madeleine
1954: "Carlos et Marguerite" (Christian Gérard) Théâtre de la Madeleine 
1955: Les Amants novices, directed by Jean Mercure, Théâtre Montparnasse
1957: Hibernatus, directed by Georges Vitaly, Théâtre de l'Athénée
1964: "Quand épousez-vous ma femme ?" (Jean Le Poulain) (Théâtre du Vaudeville) (in collab. with Jean-Pierre Conty)
Adaptator
1955 : La Lune est bleue by Hugh Herbert, directed by Jacques Charon, Théâtre Michel

Filmography 

1936: Michel Strogoff by Jacques de Baroncelli
1936: La Route impériale by Marcel L'Herbier
1938: Nights of Princes by Vladimir Strizhevsky
1941: Une femme dans la nuit by Edmond T. Greville
1942: The Beautiful Adventure by Marc Allégret
1942: Ne le criez pas sur les toits by Jacques Daniel-Norman
1942: Les Cadets de l'océan by Jean Dréville
1946: Le Visiteur by Jean Dréville
1947: Monsieur Vincent by Maurice Cloche
1948: After love by Maurice Tourneur
1948: The Genius by Miguel M. Delgado
1949:  White Paws by Jean Grémillon
1949: Doctor Laennec by Maurice Cloche
1949: Prélude à la gloire by Georges Lacombe
1951: Bluebeard by Christian-Jaque
1953: The Enchanting Enemy by Claudio Gora
1954: Les Amants de la Villa Borghese (Villa Borghese) by Gianni Franciolini
1955: Meeting in Paris by Georges Lampin
1958: Le Septième Ciel by Raymond Bernard
1959:  by Axel von Ambesser
1960: The Nabob Affair  by Ralph Habib
1960: Le Caïd by Bernard Borderie
1961: The Three Musketeers by Bernard Borderie
1961: Le Tracassin by Alex Joffé
1962: La Fayette by Jean Dréville
1963: Relaxe-toi chérie by Jean Boyer
1964: Requiem pour un caïd by Maurice Cloche
1967: Les Cracks by Alex Joffé
1969: Hibernatus by Édouard Molinaro

References

External links 
 Site dedicated to Jean Bernard-Luc
 Les Archives du spectacle
 

20th-century French screenwriters
20th-century French dramatists and playwrights
Lycée Janson-de-Sailly alumni
People from Guatemala City
1909 births
1985 deaths
Guatemalan emigrants to France